Piran Christopher Laity Holloway (born 1 October 1970) is an English former first-class cricketer.  Between 1988 and 2003, he appeared for Warwickshire and Somerset.  A left-handed batsman and wicket-keeper, Holloway made 14 appearances for England Under-19s.

References

External links

 
 

1970 births
Living people
English cricketers
Cornwall cricketers
Somerset cricketers
Warwickshire cricketers
People from Helston
British Universities cricketers